The 205th Tactical Fighter Squadron was a squadron of the 6th Air Wing of the Japan Air Self-Defense Force between 1965 and 1981. It was based at Komatsu Air Base, in Ishikawa Prefecture, Japan. It was equipped with Lockheed F-104J/DJ aircraft. Its traditions were passed on to the McDonnell Douglas F-4 Phantom II-equipped 306th Tactical Fighter Squadron.

Aircraft operated

Fighter aircraft
 Lockheed F-104J/DJ (1965–1981)

See also
 Fighter units of the Japan Air Self-Defense Force

References

Units of the Japan Air Self-Defense Force